West Jefferson Historic District is a national historic district located at West Jefferson, Ashe County, North Carolina.  The district encompasses 50 contributing buildings in the central business district of West Jefferson.  The district primarily includes one-story and two-story commercial buildings dating to the early- to mid-20th century.  Notable buildings include the West Jefferson Hotel (1917), Graybeal's Rexall Drugstore Building (c. 1950), Parkway Theater (1939), Dr. Pepper Bottling Company building (c. 1940), First Baptist Church (1929), Benjamin Cornett House, and West Jefferson Depot.

It was listed on the National Register of Historic Places in 2007.

References

Historic districts on the National Register of Historic Places in North Carolina
Buildings and structures in Ashe County, North Carolina
National Register of Historic Places in Ashe County, North Carolina